Jas Athwal (born September 1963) is a British Labour Party politician who currently serves as the Leader of Redbridge London Borough Council.

Early life and education
Jas Athwal was born in the Punjab state in India, in September 1963, into a Punjabi Jatt Sikh family. He lived there until his family relocated to Ilford, in London, England, when he was seven years old. In Ilford, his mother worked at a home sewing ties, while his father worked at a tin factory. He attended Mayfield School in Ilford, before studying at the London School of Economics.

Professional career 
Following his graduation, Athwal worked in the computer security industry, before starting his own business running a children's nursery in Redbridge, London.

Political career 
In the 2010 local elections, Athwal was elected as a Labour councillor for the Mayfield ward on Redbridge London Borough Council, taking the seat from the Conservative Party with a majority of 1368 votes.

Athwal was elected to lead the Labour Group on Redbridge Council on 11 October 2011, with 15 of the 21 votes. This followed a vote of no confidence in the previous leader, Cllr Bob Littlewood. In the 2014 local elections, Athwal led the Redbridge Labour Party to win its first ever majority on Redbridge Council, gaining 11 seats to give Labour a total of 35 of the 63 seats, winning control from the incumbent Conservative-Liberal Democrat coalition. Athwal was elected to serve as the first-ever Labour majority Leader of Redbridge Council.

At the May 2018 borough elections, Athwal led the Labour Party to another victory, securing 51 of the 63 seats. This left the Conservative opposition with 12 councillors and the Liberal Democrats with none.

In 2019, Athwal was elected Executive member for Crime and Public Protection of London Councils, the local government association that represents London's 32 Borough Councils.

Shortly before the 2019 general election, Athwal stood to be selected to be the Labour parliamentary candidate for his home constituency of Ilford South, with the incumbent Labour MP Mike Gapes having defected to Change UK. Athwal was suspended from the party on the evening before members were due to vote, on the basis of serious allegations of sexual harassment. Athwal denied the allegations and called for due process. Sam Tarry, Athwal's rival in the contest, was subsequently selected in a vote a few weeks later. The timing of Athwal's suspension on the evening before the vote, was publicly questioned by neighbouring MP, Wes Streeting, since Tarry had close links to Jeremy Corbyn, the then Leader of the Labour Party. The leader of the Conservative opposition on Redbridge Council urged Athwal to stand down as leader until the matter of his disputed suspension from the Labour Party was resolved. Redbridge Labour Group responded with a statement that "While this process runs its course, Jas Athwal will continue as Leader of Redbridge Council with our full support".

On 15 September 2020, Athwal was cleared of wrongdoing by the Labour Party, and his suspension was lifted. Athwal called for an independent probe into the way that he was suspended on the eve of the selection vote.

On 10 October 2022, Athwal was selected as the Labour prospective parliamentary candidate (PPC) for the Ilford South constituency at the next election, defeating the incumbent Sam Tarry, by 499 votes to 361.

Housing 
Following the 2014 local elections, Athwal made council housing a key part of his administration's programme, having built the first new council houses in Redbridge in 10 years. He has a target to build 1000 new affordable homes in an effort to end homelessness in Redbridge. Athwal also actively supported the Dubs amendment for unaccompanied children in Calais and in 2016, visited the Calais "jungle" refugee camp.

Athwal's housing strategy has caused controversy locally. In 2019 a petition was signed by over 3000 residents, in opposition to the Labour administration's plan to build temporary accommodation on the sites of two green spaces in Hainault, in the north of the borough. The plans were introduced in 2018 as a response to Redbridge Council's statutory duty to house 2,300 homeless households, a national reduction in local authority funding, and a consensus that the available hostel accommodation was unsuitable for families. Plans for both sites included preserving and developing the play areas and remaining green space. In response to alleged incidents of abusive language, Athwal blocked some residents on social media. Defending Athwal's decision to block some local residents on social media, the Deputy Leader of Redbridge Council invited blocked residents to contact Councillors through existing official channels.

Personal life 
Athwal is a British Sikh. He lives in Ilford, is married and has four children. Athwal is an avid supporter of local football club Woodford Town FC, who in 2020 named the stand at their new ground in Woodford Bridge, the 'Jas Athwal Stand' in recognition of Athwal's contribution to bringing it back home to Redbridge.

See also 
 British Indians
 List of British Indians
 British Punjabis
 List of British Punjabis
 British Sikhs
 List of British Sikhs
 English Sikhs

References

Living people
1963 births
Punjabi people
Indian Sikhs
Indian emigrants to the United Kingdom
Indian emigrants to England
British people of Indian descent
British people of Punjabi descent
British Sikhs
English people of Indian descent
English people of Punjabi descent
English Sikhs
Labour Party (UK) councillors
Councillors in the London Borough of Redbridge
Leaders of local authorities of England